Gayesha Perera  (born 24 October 1987, as Gayesha Lakmali Perera) is a Sri Lankan film and Teledrama actress, model and a TV presenter. She is the title holder of Miss Sri Lanka for Miss International 2006 beauty pageant.

Early life
Gayesha Perera was born in Colombo, Sri Lanka. She studied at the Subodha Balika Vidyalaya, Dehiwala and Girls High School, Mount Lavinia. At the Girls High School, Mount Lavinia she was served as a school prefect. She is married to Hasanjith Chathuranga KuruppuArachchi who is a popular Hip Hop singer & a businessman.

Miss Sri Lanka
In 2006 Gayesha won the Miss Sri Lanka for Miss International 2006 title and she represented the Sri Lanka at Miss International in China and Japan. 
 
After 3 years, she qualified to compete at Miss Tourism Queen International 2009 pageant, which was held in the Wuhan, China, and there she won the Miss Talent mini title.

At the Avirate Miss Sri Lanka for Miss Universe 2011 competition, Gayesha won the Miss Congeniality title.

In 2012 Gayesha represented her country at the Miss Supertalent of the World 2012 beauty pageant, and there she was eligible to enter the top 15 list. She won the pageant's Miss Personality and Best National Costume mini titles.

Filmography

Controversy
2010 Gayesha's movie Flying Fish provoked controversy in the country and with Perera's entry into politics, her controversial character in this movie brought her critical notice.

Teledrama

TV programs

Music videos

Gayesha Perera also appeared in Sirasa Dancing Stars reality show. And participated to Derana Star City season 1 reality show.

References

External links 
Gayesha Perera's Biography in Sinhala Cinema Database

Sri Lankan film actresses
Sri Lankan female models
1987 births
Miss International 2006 delegates
Living people
Sri Lankan beauty pageant winners
Sinhalese actresses
Sinhalese models